They Won't Believe Me is a 1947 black-and-white film noir directed by Irving Pichel and starring Robert Young, Susan Hayward and Jane Greer. It was produced by Alfred Hitchcock's longtime assistant and collaborator, Joan Harrison.

Plot
After the prosecution rests its case in the murder trial of Larry Ballentine, the defendant takes the stand to tell his story.

In flashback, Larry recounts how he started seeing Janice Bell, innocently enough, but feelings developed between them. When Larry is unwilling to divorce Greta, whom he had married for her money, Janice gets a job transfer. Larry tells her he will run off with her, that he will dump Greta. But Greta knows all about the relationship and is unwilling to give Larry up. She tells him she has purchased a quarter-interest in a brokerage in Los Angeles for him. The temptation is too great, and Larry  abandons Janice, never explaining or saying goodbye.

At the brokerage, Larry is reprimanded by his business partner, Trenton, for neglecting a rich client, but employee Verna Carlson shows Trenton a copy of a letter she lets Trenton believe Larry wrote and sent, when it was she who actually had. Verna is an admitted gold-digger, involved with Trenton, but she is interested in Larry and he lets her seduce him.

As before, Greta finds out about Larry's affair, but will not seek a divorce. She sells the brokerage interest and buys an old Spanish ranch in the mountains. Once again she makes Larry choose. Larry tells Verna he is ending their affair, much to her bitter disappointment.

The ranch is isolated, without phone or mail service. There is a general store down the road. Larry is bored, but Greta loves their life. After some time, she tells Larry that she wants to build a guest house for an aunt he despises, who reviles him in return. He concocts a plan; he claims that he knows an architect who can prepare plans for the addition and, on the pretext of calling him, phones Verna from the store and arranges to meet her in Los Angeles.

Larry tells Verna he will run away with her after cleaning out his and Greta's joint checking account. He writes a large check for her to cash, and leaves a note for Greta declaring he has left her. Verna meets him as planned, but returns the check. Verna has also bought herself a cheap wedding ring, inducing him to follow through on his promise to divorce Greta and marry her.

As they drive to Reno that night, an oncoming truck blows a tire and swerves into their path. Verna is killed and burned beyond recognition. Larry wakes up in the hospital. Because of the ring, Verna has been misidentified as Greta. Larry does not correct the error.

Once he recovers, he returns to the ranch to kill Greta for her money before she is seen alive, but she is not there. Going to her favorite spot, a cliff by a waterfall, he finds at the top the goodbye note he left for her and discovers her body at the bottom. He dumps her corpse in the dark pool below the falls.

Depressed but now rich, Larry tours South America and the Caribbean, unsuccessfully trying to cheer himself up. In Jamaica, he runs into Janice. He persuades her to reconcile, and they return to Los Angeles. Later, arriving early to meet her at her hotel, he sees Trenton go into her room. Eavesdropping, he learns that Trenton is concerned about Verna's disappearance and has enticed Janice to help bring Larry home.

Ultimately, Trenton calls in the police. They find Greta's decomposed body, but assume it is Verna's. The local storekeeper is a witness to Larry and Verna driving away together, the last time she was seen. The police theorize that Larry killed her because she was blackmailing him.

While the jury deliberates, Larry is visited by Janice, whose love for him has revived. He says he knows he has no chance of acquittal, and has passed judgment on himself. Back in court, as the verdict begins to be read, Larry rushes to an open window, but before he can jump, he is shot dead by the courtroom guard.

The verdict is then read: Not guilty.

Cast

Reception
Dennis Schwartz, in a 2003 review of the film, called the film, "An outstanding film noir melodrama whose adultery tale is much in the same nature as a Hitchcock mystery or James M. Cain's gritty Double Indemnity."

Ted Shen, reviewing the film for the Chicago Reader, also compares the film to Cain's writing and praises the acting, and wrote, "Cast against type, Young manages to be both creepy and sympathetic. Actor-turned-director Irving Pichel gets hard-boiled performances from a solid cast."

Critic Steve Press wrote, "The flashback structure of this suspenseful film noir effectively creates a foreboding tension that mounts to a powerful final scene."

In an interview on The Dick Cavett Show aired on September 9, 1968, Robert Young claimed he made one picture in which he played a nasty character, resulting in a box-office flop, They Won’t Believe Me.

Restoration

In 1957, the 95-minute film was cut to 80 minutes for reissue as part of a double feature. This was generally the only version available until Warner Bros. (the current owner of the RKO library) restored it to its full length in 2021. It premiered on Turner Classic Movies on May 8, followed by a Blu-Ray release via Warner Archive three days later.

References

External links
 
 
 
 
 

1947 films
American black-and-white films
American courtroom films
1947 crime drama films
Film noir
Films scored by Roy Webb
Films directed by Irving Pichel
American crime drama films
RKO Pictures films
1940s English-language films
1940s American films